Flávia Carolina Peres Arruda (born 21 January 1980 in Taguatinga) is a Brazilian entrepreneur, lawyer and politician, member of the Liberal Party. She is the incumbent Secretary of Government of Brazil.

Biography
Arruda began her bachelor's degree in Physical Education in the Catholic University of Brasília but didn't conclude it. Flávia worked in Taguatinga for a while, until she decided to open a school in Recanto das Emas. Married to former Governor of the Federal District, José Roberto Arruda, Flávia is mother of two daughters.

After an invitation made by Rede Bandeirantes, she was presenter of the show "Nossa Gente", which showed social projects. A few years later, she moved to São Paulo, where she was a weather presenter in a national TV news program.

In 2019, Arruda concluded her bachelor's degree in Laws at the Euroamerican University Center. In 2021, she was elect Chair of the Planning, Public Budget and Oversight Mixed Committee of the National Congress.

References

External links
 

|-

|-

1980 births
Living people
21st-century Brazilian lawyers
Democrats (Brazil) politicians
Government ministers of Brazil
Liberal Party (Brazil, 2006) politicians
Members of the Chamber of Deputies (Brazil) from the Federal District
Women government ministers of Brazil